Meta-functional expertise is the breadth of one’s strategically important knowledge. It differs from the traditional conceptualization of expertise, which is generally considered to be a great depth of knowledge in a defined area, and where thus experts are people who are distinguished as knowing a lot about a particular subject. Comparatively, a meta-functional expert is considered to be somewhat knowledgeable in many different areas but not necessarily an expert in any single domain.

Compared to generalists 
Someone high on meta-functional expertise is similar to a generalist in that they have a wide array of knowledge. However, where generalists know many different things meta-functional experts have enough depth of knowledge in each area to be considered knowledgeable by other members of their team at work.

Results of meta-functional expertise
Individuals high on meta-functional expertise are: 
Better able to acquire social power at work because they can translate between specialists.
More successful as entrepreneurs 
More innovative
More likely to get promoted at work
Better able to get information from people outside of their work team

Groups with more meta-functional experts on them perform better because they:
Communicate better with one another and share more ideas 
Understand their surroundings better 
Gain knowledge external to the group more efficiently
Are more innovative

See also 
 Interdisciplinarity, utilization of specialist knowledge from several areas to solve a problem
 Interdiscipline, a discipline based on several disciplines, but which can also be considered an independent discipline

References 

Knowledge